Charlotte Sophia Somerset, Duchess of Beaufort (11 January 1771 – 12 August 1854), formerly Lady Charlotte Sophia Leveson-Gower, was the wife of Henry Somerset, 6th Duke of Beaufort.

She was the daughter of Granville Leveson-Gower, 1st Marquess of Stafford, and his wife, the former Lady Susanna Stewart.

She married the future duke, then Marquess of Worcester, on 16 May 1791 at Lambeth Church, London. They had four sons and eight daughters:

 Henry Somerset, 7th Duke of Beaufort (1792–1853)
 Lord Granville Charles Henry Somerset (1792–1848), who married Hon. Emily Smith and had children
 Lord William George Henry Somerset (1793-1794)
 Lady Charlotte Sophia Somerset (1795–1865), who married Frederick Gough, 4th Baron Calthorpe, and had children.
 Lady Elizabeth Susan Somerset (1798-1876), who married twice (first, Captain Lord Edward O'Brien; second, Maj-Gen. James Orde), and had children.
 Lady Georgiana Augusta Somerset (1800-1865), who married Granville Dudley Ryder and had children.
 Lord Edward Henry Somerset (1802-1803)
 Lady Susan Carolina Somerset (1804-1886), who married George Cholmondeley, 2nd Marquess of Cholmondeley, and had no children
 Lady Louisa Elizabeth Somerset (1806-1892), who married George Finch, and had children
 Lady Isabella Somerset (1808-1831), who married Colonel Thomas Henry Kingscote and had children
 Lady Harriett Blanche Somerset (1811-1885), who married Randolph Stewart, 9th Earl of Galloway, and had children
 Lady Mary Octavia Somerset (1814-1906), who married Sir Walter Farquhar, 3rd Baronet, and had children.

In 1803, her husband succeeded his father as Duke of Beaufort, and she rose from marchioness to duchess. Her portrait was painted by Sir Francis Grant. The duke died in 1835 and was buried in St Michael and All Angels Church, Badminton.  The dowager duchess then lived with her youngest daughter at her London home in Grosvenor Square. She died in 1854, aged 83, at Westbrook Hall, Hertfordshire.

She was included in the "Gallery of Beauties" series commissioned by Prince Regent (later King) George IV.

References

1771 births
1854 deaths
English duchesses by marriage
Daughters of British marquesses